Kawasato may refer to:

Kawasato, Saitama, a former town in Kitasaitama District, Saitama Prefecture, Japan
4910 Kawasato, a main-belt asteroid

People with the surname
, Japanese astronomer

Japanese-language surnames